Konstantin N. Svitnev is an international reproductive lawyer of Russian origin.  Svitnev was born in 1966 and grew up in Moscow. Svitnev spent much of his legal career as an advocate for gender equality and reproductive rights...

Life 
Svitnev graduated from the Moscow State Linguistics University and International Law Institute at the Ministry of Justice of Russia. In 2003 Svitnev co-founded Rosjurconsulting – an international law firm specialized in reproductive law and third-party reproduction incl. surrogacy all over the world, the first and only such company in Russia and Europe. Since then, he's the C.E.O. of this company dealing with all related legal issues for more than 18 years. He's also the founder of the Reproductive Law and Ethics Research Center.

Legal achievements 
Svitnev was the first to prove in the Russian court that single intended parents, women (St. Petersburg, 2009) and men (Moscow, 2010) have the same right to become parents through surrogacy, opening the way to surrogacy for hundreds and thousands of single intended parents, thus becoming a champion for reproductive rights and dubbed "The first Russian reprodissident".

Notable cases 
In 2009 Mr. Svitnev acted for Ms. Natalia Gorskaya in a famous Gorskaya v Russia case in St. Petersburg, which allowed a birth certificate to the name of a single woman who became mother through surrogacy for the first time in Russia. With Svitnev's legal help Natalia Gorskaya won a ruling holding that single women have the same right to become mothers through surrogacy as married ones.

In Aug. 2010 Konstantin Svitnev won a case in a Moscow court that ruled in favour of his client, the first Russian man who became father through surrogacy. Basing on a previous Svitnev's precedent victory regarding single women's right to procreate through surrogacy and on art. 19 of the Russian Constitution, the court decided that single men have the same right to become fathers through surrogacy in Russia. The case established for the first time that surrogacy for single men is enforceable in Russia.

Oct. 2010: Svitnev won a precedent case for Natalia Klimova, well-known businesswoman from St. Petersburg. After her only son Artiom's death she became mother and grandmother at the same time - through surrogacy - using her late son's frozen sperm kept at a local IVF clinic and donated oocytes. The court made the State registration authority (ZAGS) to register her newborn son and grandson Egor in her name.

March 2011: In another case Svitnev represented the first Russian man who fathered twins through surrogacy to allow him to be listed as their father and the only parent in St. Petersburg.

Oct. 2014: Mr. Svitnev represented another client, a single man who became father through surrogacy in the Supreme Court of Russia. The highest judicial authority in Russia ruled in favor of Svitnev's client making it possible for him to be listed as father and the only parent of his child born to a surrogate.

In Jan. 2015 Konstantin Svitnev won Paradiso and Campanelli v. Italy case at the European Court of Human Rights.

Recent events, crackdown on surrogacy in Russia 
Svitnev and his law firm Rosjurconsulting have been the principal target of recent crackdown on surrogacy and reproductive rights in Russia. The "Investigative" committee of Russia in Jan. 2020 kidnapped and put into an orphanage a few foreign children falsely claiming a disclosure of a "child-trafficking gang", allegedly selling thousands of "Russian children" abroad. Actually, there were only 4 children gestated by surrogates whose genetic origin was questioned by the investigation, not thousands. Direct genetic link of all these 4 children with their foreign parents, patients of Moscow IVF clinics, was re-confirmed by the "investigation" itself in April, 2020. Nevertheless, the Investigative Committee of Russia preferred to proceed with a fabricated criminal case and initiated arrests of doctors, lawyers and managers of surrogacy agencies on July 14, 2020.

Svitnev's own four children, who have just turned 4, were kidnapped the same day by so-called "investigation" from his country house and were put into an infectious disease clinic. Svitnev's lawyers managed to save the children only in a few very shocking days. Svitnev himself escaped arrest by pure chance, being abroad and unable to come to Russia due to COVID-19 restrictions. On Sept. 30th, 2020 Russian state news agency TASS informed that the Investigative Committee of Russia had been planning arrests of Russian single men who became fathers through surrogacy in Russia. Several men, Svitnev's clients had to flee Russia with their newborn children, saving their lives and freedom. As culmination of this witch hunt, in Nov. 2020 Svitnev, most prominent figure in Russian assisted reproduction, was "arrested" in absentia by a Russian kangaroo court.

Svitnev stated, referring to this case: "Russian authorities are destroying people who dedicated their lives to helping others to become parents, wishing just to put an end to a possibility for single men to become fathers through surrogacy in Russia, that I proved to be legal back in 2010. Innocent people and foreign children are held hostages until the State Duma approves a racist and discriminatory law forbidding access to surrogacy in Russia to single men and all foreigners, regardless of their marital status, law that has just been introduced into the Russian parliament by homophobic anti-surrogacy lobby"

On July 21, 2021 the Investigative Committee of Russia officially claimed that "baby-selling" crime consisted in "using donated oocytes" and that a direct linkage of children to their genetic fathers was irrelevant

Personal life 
In June, 2016 Svitnev fathered four children, two boys and two girls, being their only parent through a Russian court decision and setting thus a Guinness record as a single man who becomes a father of four at a time.

Further references 

 https://www.economist.com/europe/2021/03/18/russias-liberal-surrogacy-rules-are-under-threat
 https://www.bbc.com/russian/features-54468421
 https://meduza.io/en/feature/2020/10/05/the-invention-of-gay-mutilators
 https://www.bbc.com/russian/features-54301985
 https://www.independent.co.uk/news/world/europe/russia-gay-putin-arrest-lbgt-surrogate-b746395.html

References 

Russian lawyers
Reproductive rights activists
1966 births
Living people